A by-election for the Australian House of Representatives seat of Kalgoorlie was triggered by the death, on 25 November 1913, of Labor MP and Postmaster-General Charlie Frazer. Aged 33, Frazer was the youngest member of the Australian Parliament ever to die. By the close of nominations on 22 December, only one candidate, Labor's Hugh Mahon, previously member for Coolgardie from 1910 to 1913, had nominated, and he was thus declared elected unopposed.

Results

References

1913 elections in Australia
Western Australian federal by-elections
1910s in Western Australia
Unopposed by-elections